The Kalevala is the Finnish national epic poem.

Kalevala may also refer to:

Places

Europe 
Kalevala, Russia, an urban-type settlement in the Republic of Karelia, Russia
Kalevalsky District, an administrative district raion in the Republic of Karelia
Kaleva, a district of Kuhmo

North America 
Kalevala Township, Minnesota, a civil township in Minnesota, U.S.

Arts, entertainment and media
Kalevala (band), a Russian folk metal band
Kalevala, a comic adaptation of the epic poem by Sami Makkonen
Kalevala meter, the poetic meter used in the Kalevala and the Kalevipoeg epic poems
Kaleva, a Finnish movie from 2013

Brands and enterprises
Kalevala, a Finnish gin
Kalevala, a Finnish jewelry brand

Transportation
Kalevala (corvette), an 1858 flagship of the Finnish naval equipage

Other uses
Kalevala Sport, a volleyball team from Kajaani
1454 Kalevala, an asteroid
Kalevala Village, a tourist attraction in Kuhmo
Kalevala Grade School, a school in Minnesota, USA 
Kalevala School, a former school in Kuopio, Finland (until 2016)
The Kalevala Society, a Finnish scientific and artistic society founded in 1911